John Wiedeman is an American broadcaster who is the radio play-by-play announcer for the National Hockey League's Chicago Blackhawks.

Early life and career
Wiedeman grew up in Kansas City, Missouri. He worked for his family's plumbing parts supply company until 1988. Wiedeman attended the University of Kansas and graduated in 1989. He decided to pursue a career in broadcasting at the age of 31. Wiedeman moved to Chicago in 1992 where he hoped to find work as a sports broadcaster. He was a bartender at a comedy club in Mount Prospect, Illinois and also served as an unpaid reporter for WCSJ in Morris, Illinois to cover Chicago Blackhawks games.

Broadcasting career
Wiedeman served as the radio and TV play-by-play broadcaster for the Muskegon Fury (1992–1994), Worcester IceCats (1994–1996), and Cincinnati Cyclones (1997–2001). He worked his way to the National Hockey League (NHL), where he served as the radio and substitute TV play-by-play commentator for the Philadelphia Flyers (1996), Tampa Bay Lightning (1997), Columbus Blue Jackets (2001), and New York Islanders (2001–2006). He joined the Chicago Blackhawks in 2006 and served as the team's radio play-by-play commentator. Wiedeman provided commentary for the Blackhawks alongside Troy Murray on the radio, including three Stanley Cup Finals in 2010, 2013 and 2015.

In 2021, the Blackhawks announced Pat Foley would retire as the team's TV play-by-play commentator after the season. Wiedeman, along with other announcers, "auditioned" to succeed Foley throughout the 2021–22 NHL season. In 2022, The Blackhawks announced that Wiedeman would not succeed Foley as the team's TV play-by-play announcer, but retain his role the team's lead radio play-by-play announcer for the 2022–23 NHL season.

Awards and honors
John has been awarded the following honors by the Illinois Broadcasters Association:

 2015 Best Play by Play, Chicago Market. Shared with colleagues Troy Murray and Judd Sirott.

 2014 Best Play by Play, Chicago Market. Shared with Murray and Sirott.

 2014 National Sportscaster and Sportswriters Association Illinois Sportscaster of the Year.

 2012 Best Sports Story shared with Murray.

 2011 Best Play by Play, Chicago Market shared with Murray.

Personal life
Wiedeman and his wife, Kelly, have one daughter and one son.

References 

Chicago Blackhawks announcers
National Hockey League broadcasters
Living people
Year of birth missing (living people)
American sports announcers
New York Islanders announcers
Philadelphia Flyers announcers
University of Kansas alumni
American Hockey League broadcasters